The 1986 Baltimore Orioles season was a season in American baseball. It involved the Orioles finishing 7th in the American League East with a record of 73 wins and 89 losses. On August 5, the Orioles were in second place with a record of 59–47, just 2.5 games out of first place, but the Orioles would lose 42 of their final 56 games to finish in last place in the AL East.

Offseason 
 October 9, 1985: Joe Nolan was released by the Orioles.
 December 12, 1985: Gary Roenicke and a player to be named later were traded by the Orioles to the New York Yankees for Rex Hudler and Rich Bordi. The Orioles completed the deal by sending Leo Hernández to the Yankees on December 16.
 January 14, 1986: Rafael Bournigal was drafted by the Orioles in the 10th round of the 1986 Major League Baseball draft, but did not sign.
 January 23, 1986: Dan Ford was released by the Orioles.
 February 20, 1986: Luis DeLeón was signed as a free agent by the Orioles.
 March 23, 1986: Mike Kinnunen was signed as a free agent by the Orioles.
 March 31, 1986: Ben Bianchi (minors), Steve Padia (minors), and a player to be named later were traded by the Orioles to the Minnesota Twins for Mike Hart. The Orioles completed the deal by sending Jeff Hubbard (minors) to the Twins on April 23.

Regular season

Season standings

Record vs. opponents

Opening Day starters 
 Rick Dempsey
 Mike Flanagan
 Jackie Gutiérrez
 Lee Lacy
 Fred Lynn
 Eddie Murray
 Cal Ripken
 John Shelby
 Alan Wiggins
 Mike Young

Notable transactions 
 June 2, 1986: Gordon Dillard was drafted by the Orioles in the 14th round of the 1986 Major League Baseball draft.
 June 16, 1986: Dennis Martínez and a player to be named later were traded by the Orioles to the Montreal Expos for a player to be named later. The Orioles completed the deal by sending John Stefero to the Expos on December 8. The Expos completed the deal by sending Rene Gonzales to the Orioles on December 16.

Roster

Player stats

Batting

Starters by position 
Note: Pos = Position; G = Games played; AB = At bats; H = Hits; Avg. = Batting average; HR = Home runs; RBI = Runs batted in

Other batters 
Note: G = Games played; AB = At bats; H = Hits; Avg. = Batting average; HR = Home runs; RBI = Runs batted in

Pitching

Starting pitchers 
Note: G = Games pitched; IP = Innings pitched; W = Wins; L = Losses; ERA = Earned run average; SO = Strikeouts

Relief pitchers 
Note: G = Games pitched; W = Wins; L = Losses; SV = Saves; ERA = Earned run average; SO = Strikeouts

Farm system

References

1986 Baltimore Orioles team page at Baseball Reference
1986 Baltimore Orioles season at baseball-almanac.com

Baltimore Orioles seasons
Baltimore Orioles season
Baltimore Orioles